Georgi Dinkov (born 20 May 1991) is a Bulgarian footballer who plays as a defender for Beroe Stara Zagora.

Honours

Club
Beroe
Bulgarian Cup (1): 2013
Bulgarian Supercup (1): 2013

References

External links
Player profile at Soccerway

1991 births
Living people
People from Gabrovo
Bulgarian footballers
Association football defenders
First Professional Football League (Bulgaria) players
Second Professional Football League (Bulgaria) players
PFC Beroe Stara Zagora players
PFC Spartak Varna players
OFC Sliven 2000 players
FC Dunav Ruse players